The Man Who Seeks the Truth (French: L'homme qui cherche la vérité) is a 1940 French comedy film directed by Alexander Esway and starring Raimu, Yvette Lebon and André Alerme. The film's art direction was by Henri Ménessier.
In 1945, it was loosely remade in Hollywood as Bring on the Girls starring Veronica Lake.

Plot summary

Cast

References

Bibliography 
 Rège, Philippe. Encyclopedia of French Film Directors, Volume 1. Scarecrow Press, 2009.

External links 
 
 

1940 films
1940 comedy films
French comedy films
1940s French-language films
Films directed by Alexander Esway
French black-and-white films
1940s French films